Orangeburg is an unincorporated community in Mason County, Kentucky, United States.

The Milton Mills in Orangeburg are listed on the National Register of Historic Places.

Notes

Unincorporated communities in Mason County, Kentucky
Unincorporated communities in Kentucky